Gosen-Neu Zittau is a municipality in the Oder-Spree district, in Brandenburg, Germany. Neu Zittau is situated in the Spree valley, near the Oder-Spree-Canal.

Geography

Neighbouring places
 Erkner
 Königs Wusterhausen
 Spreenhagen
 Berlin

Division of the town
 Gosen
 Neu Zittau
 Burig
 Steinfurt

Demography

References

Localities in Oder-Spree